Gloria Majiga–Kamoto (born c. 1991) is a Malawian community development officer and environmental activist, who was awarded the 2021 Goldman Environmental Prize for Africa, in recognition of her work in advocating for the enforcement of a national ban on the importation, manufacture and distribution of single-use plastics in Malawi, in 2019.

Background and education
Gloria was born in Malawi circa 1991. She attended Malawian elementary and secondary schools. She holds a bachelors degree from the University of Malawi. She has enrolled in the Master of Laws degree program at the University of London, on scholarship from the Canon Collins Educational & Legal Assistance Trust.

Career
Following completion of her undergraduate degree studies, Gloria was hired by Centre for Environmental Policy and Advocacy (CEPA), a non-government organisation based in Limbe, a suburb of Blantyre, the financial capital of Malawi.

She was put in charge of the “Sustainable Agriculture Lead Farmer Project” which included a “pass-on” programme for goats and other livestock. The programme donated a female goat to one farmer. When that female produced a kid, the farmer would pass on the goat to the next farmer and so on, until all the farmers in the cohort had goats.

However, the program was not progressing as planned. Some of the farmers lost their goats because they ingested plastic waste strewn around the Malawian countryside and died from intestinal obstruction as a result.

Activism
Malawi has on its books a law passed in 2015, which prohibits the importation, manufacture and distribution of single-use plastic. However, the law was not being enforced. Attempts by Gloria and her fellow environmentalists to hold civil dialogue with plastics manufactures in Malawi were rebuffed. As of 2016, Malawian plastic manufacturers were producing 75,000 tons of plastic annually. Of this, 80 percent was single-use, which is difficult to recycle. Plastic waste was clogging waterways and when consumed by livestock, was killing some of the animals.

The association of plastic manufacturers sued the government, challenging the ban on single-use plastic. They won in the lower courts but the case was appealed to the country's Supreme Court. Gloria and her fellow environmentalists organized public demonstrations to highlight the "plastic problem" in the country. A study commissioned by the government of Malawi, documented that the country produces more plastic waste per capita, than any other country in sub-Saharan Africa.

Over a five-year period, the court case made it to the Supreme Court of Malawi. In July 2019, the Supreme Court ruled that the manufacture, marketing, sale and use of single-use plastic (60 microns or less) was illegal in Malawi. Since 2019, three factories have been shut down and the fourth had its manufacturing equipment impounded.

Family
Gloria Majiga–Kamoto is a mother to one son.

See also
 Thai Van Nguyen
 Kimiko Hirata
 Maida Bilal
 Sharon Lavigne
 Liz Chicaje Churay

References

External links
Goldman Prize 2021: Gloria Majiga-Kamoto battled against single use plastic in Malawi and won As of 15 June 2021.
 Winners of the Goldman Environmental Prize In 2021 

1991 births
Living people
African environmentalists
Women environmentalists
Southern Region, Malawi
Malawian women
People from Blantyre
Malawian activists